Kim Yang-shik is a Korean poet, essayist and Indologist.

The Indian connection
Kim Yang-shik was born in Seoul on January 4, 1931. At Ewha Womans University she studied English literature and then took an MA in Indian philosophy. Inspired by the writings of Rabindranath Tagore, and having made the first of many visits to India in 1975, she founded the Tagore Society of Korea in 1981 and has been steadily translating Tagore's poetical works into Korean. She is also the incumbent Director of the Indian Art Museum in Seoul. She was honored by the Government of India in 2002 with the highest Indian civilian award of the Golden Padma Shri for her contributions to cultural exchange through the Korea-India Cultural Society.

Poetry
Kim Yang-shik began publishing her own poetry during the 1970s and has authored several collections. Her Indian connection has been fruitful, not only providing her with inspiration for such collections as "The Day Breaks of India" (1999) but also as the country from which several other translations of her work have been published. Her poems have been translated into several other languages and in 2009 there appeared another selection in Swedish translation, De är aldrig ensamma (They are never alone), followed by a French translation, India, in 2014. An essayist in addition, she has published "An Encounter with Foreign Poets" (1978), "Along the Stream of Ganges" (1990) and "Spring, Summer, Autumn and Winter" (2000).

Among the literary associations to which Kim belongs are the Korean Modern Poets' Association and the Korean Women Writers' Association; she is also involved with the Korean chapter of the International PEN Club. She was the recipient of the Muse Of World Poetry award at the second Congress of World Poets in Taipei in 1973 and the PEN Literary Award from the Korean PEN Club in 2002.

The poem "Compassion" gives an idea of Kim's individual style:

Works in English translation
 Bird's Sunrise & other poems, Calcutta, India (1986)
 India : selected poems by Kim Yang-Shik, Seoul (1993)
 They Are Never Lonely, translators Jin-sup Kim, Eugene W. Zeilfelder, Seoul (1998)
 The Day Breaks of India, a trilingual edition with Kim Yang-Shik's Korean originals accompanied by translations into English by Jin-sup Kim, and into Hindi by Divik Ramesh; Delhi, India (1999)

References

Recipients of the Padma Shri in literature & education
Living people
Indologists
People from Seoul
20th-century South Korean poets
Ewha Womans University alumni
1931 births
South Korean women poets
20th-century South Korean women writers